Karstens is a surname. Notable people with the surname include:

Jeff Karstens (born 1982), American baseball pitcher
Harry Karstens (1878–1955), American mountaineer
Gerben Karstens (1942–2022), Dutch cyclist

See also
 Carstens
 Karsten

Surnames of German origin